Codename: Strykeforce is a comic book series by Top Cow and Image Comics about a team of mercenary superheroes.

Publication
Codename: Strykeforce is an offshoot of another series called Cyberforce, which is about a group of cyborg shock troops. The series lasted for fourteen issues. The first nine were written by David Wohl and Marc Silvestri and illustrated by Brandon Peterson, with the last five written by Steve Gerber and illustrated by Billy Tan Mung Khoy. A few fill-in artists included Joe Benitez in issue #8 and Michael Turner in issue #14. Issue #0 was published between #13 and 14 with a story by Mike Heisler and art by Anthony Wynn. Gerber and Tan also handled the two-part Cyberforce/Codename: Strykeforce crossover, which ended with the character Stryker disbanding Codename: Strykeforce.

The comic was relaunched in 2004 as Strykeforce, which lasted for 5 issues.  The relaunch was written by Jay Faerber and penciled in by Tyler Kirkham.

Story

Issue #0
When a mission comes along that Cyberforce won't touch, Stryker puts together his team to take care of business. Team members include Stryker, a cyborg with three cybernetic arms on his right side which can be detached; Phade, a mutant who can alter his molecular density; Black Anvil (often referred to simply as Anvil), a short cobalt blue powerhouse with incredible strength; Bloodbow, an expert marksman; Icarus, a man with hollow bones and the power of flight. The mission turns out to be a set-up and Phade disappears after using his powers too long and his molecules drift apart. They find that one of their opponents has also been deceived and she joins the team as Tempest, a woman with the power to control the weather.
Between the story in issues #0 and #1, Anvil is sent to the Himalayan Mountains to recruit Killrazor, a martial arts expert who can create knives from any portion of his body.

Death's Angel
Stryker and Icarus are sent to Ukraine to protect President Bill Clinton during a peace conference. The proceedings are attacked and Stryker protects the president but Icarus is killed. Several other dignitaries are abducted by a villain who called himself Death's Angel, and Strykeforce tracks him to his nuclear submarine. After boarding the sub, and after a few skirmishes, they narrowly prevent a nuclear missile strike on New York. Instead of payment for the mission, Strykeforce takes the sub as their new base of operations.

Stormwatch
Stryker and his team are tasked with a high-stakes mission to locate and capture an extraterrestrial capable of replicating human beings with alarming precision. With the help of Weatherman One Henry Bendix, they navigate the complex terrain of Skywatch in pursuit of this elusive and potentially dangerous entity. The alien duplicates Anvil and begins to stir up trouble between Strykeforce and Stormwatch, the super team that lives on the space station. The alien is eventually uncovered and fought by both teams. After the encounter, however, the alien accidentally kills Bloodbow and decides to take his form and replace him as a member of Strykeforce. For the remainder of the series (issues #8-14), Bloodbow is the female, alien shapeshifter Sh'rrrnn.

Scavengers
Stryker next accepts a mission from Joshua Thornewood to find a Fountain of Youth hidden in the Himalayas and protected by a Yeti. The main reason he takes on such an odd task for his squad is that Joshua's twin brother Jacob has hired a rival team, the Scavengers, to accomplish the same mission. The leader of the Scavengers, Rancor Deathstrike, is an old rival of Stryker's and the two teams battle each other to achieve the intended goal.

The Industrial Accidents
In dire financial straits, Stryker next splits the Strykeforce into two teams to take on dual missions so they can make more money. Both missions turn out to be a setup masterminded by a U.S. senator. Stryker, angry at the deception, makes him pay up anyway. In retaliation, the senator hires a villainous group called the Industrial Accidents to take down Strykeforce. During the long and ensuing conflict, Stryker is captured by the Accidents and is then rescued by his old team, Cyberforce. Bloodbow is "killed" and transforms back into the more powerful alien form of Sh'rrrnn to continue the fight. With the fate of both Stryker and Bloodbow unknown, the rest of the team heads back to the sub to wait for news.

Opposing Forces
Bloodbow returns to Strykeforce and finally reveals to the team that he is a shapeshifting alien. Strykeforce and Cyberforce team up to repel an invasion by Sh'rrrnn's people, the Shu'roch. After the adventure, Stryker announces that the team was a mistake from the start and disbands the Strykeforce.

References

External links 
 http://www.comics.org/series/7137/ Codename: Stryke Force @ Grand Comics Database
 http://www.comicvine.com/codename-strykeforce/49-6637/ Codename: Strykeforce @ Comic Vine

Top Cow titles
Image Comics superhero teams
Cyber Force characters
Characters created by Marc Silvestri